Reminiscences of Yearning is an Iranian experimental film directed by Rouzbeh Rashidi.

Production
Rashidi made this film with no budget in diary-film style over a period of six years between 1998 and 2004. The film was shot with VHS and digital camera. Rashidi re-shot most of the footage from a TV screen in order to create and emphasize on video texture. The film was completed in 2011.

Further reading
 Review of the film Reminiscences of Yearning (2011) By Jit Phokaew

References

External links

Reminiscences of Yearning on Mubi (website)

2011 films
Films set in Iran
Iranian black-and-white films
Iranian avant-garde and experimental films
2010s English-language films